Stannington may refer to:

Stannington, Northumberland, a village in Northumberland, UK
Stannington, Sheffield, a suburb in Sheffield, UK
Stannington (ward), an electoral district in Sheffield, UK